Players and pairs who neither have high enough rankings nor receive wild cards may participate in a qualifying tournament held one week before the annual Wimbledon Tennis Championships.

Seeds

  Olivia Sanchez (first round)
  Ayumi Morita (first round)
  Barbora Záhlavová-Strýcová (qualified)
  Séverine Brémond (qualified)
  Lourdes Domínguez Lino (second round)
  Anna Lapushchenkova (first round)
  Alicia Molik (first round)
  Stéphanie Foretz (qualified)
  Magdaléna Rybáriková (qualified)
  Lilia Osterloh (second round)
  Melinda Czink (first round)
  Mathilde Johansson (qualified)
  Andreja Klepač (second round)
  Yaroslava Shvedova (second round)
  Olga Puchkova (qualifying competition)
  Anastasiya Yakimova (qualifying competition)
  Vesna Manasieva (second round)
  Yuliana Fedak (second round)
  Roberta Vinci (second round)
  Anastasia Pavlyuchenkova (qualified)
  Jelena Kostanić Tošić (qualifying competition)
  María José Martínez Sánchez (qualified)
  Emmanuelle Gagliardi (first round)
  Maria Elena Camerin (qualified)

Qualifiers

  Anastasia Pavlyuchenkova
  Zuzana Ondrášková
  Barbora Záhlavová-Strýcová
  Séverine Brémond
  María José Martínez Sánchez
  Viktoriya Kutuzova
  Maria Elena Camerin
  Stéphanie Foretz
  Magdaléna Rybáriková
  Rika Fujiwara
  Eva Hrdinová
  Mathilde Johansson

Qualifying draw

First qualifier

Second qualifier

Third qualifier

Fourth qualifier

Fifth qualifier

Sixth qualifier

Seventh qualifier

Eighth qualifier

Ninth qualifier

Tenth qualifier

Eleventh qualifier

Twelfth qualifier

External links

2008 Wimbledon Championships on WTAtennis.com
2008 Wimbledon Championships – Women's draws and results at the International Tennis Federation

Women's Singles Qualifying
Wimbledon Championship by year – Women's singles qualifying
Wimbledon Championships